FERM and PDZ domain containing 3 is a protein that in humans is encoded by the FRMPD3 gene.

References

Further reading 

Genes on human chromosome X